OJSC Agroinvestbank is one of the largest banks in Tajikistan.  The bank is currently led by chairman Murodali Alimardon.
Agroinvestbank is Tajikistan's second largest bank. Unfortunately it's also known to be one the most corrupt - with the chairman directing all the funds for himself and his family while the public does not see any benefits of the commercial bank.

References

External links
 Official website

Banks of Tajikistan